John Allan (born 1872 in Glasgow, Scotland) was a footballer who played in the English Football League for Derby County and Notts County. He also played for Glasgow Thistle and Heanor Town.

References

Scottish footballers
Derby County F.C. players
Notts County F.C. players
English Football League players
1872 births
Year of death missing
Thistle F.C. players
Footballers from Glasgow
Heanor Town F.C. players
Association football forwards